Cranioschisis (Greek: κρανιον kranion, "skull", and σχίσις schisis, "split"), or dysraphism, is a neural tube defect involving the skull. In this defect, the cranium fails to close completely (especially at the occipital region). Thus, the brain is exposed to the amnios and eventually degenerates, causing anencephaly.

Craniorachischisis is on the extreme end of the dysraphism spectrum, wherein the entire length of the neural tube fails to close.

See also
 Rachischisis
 Spina bifida

References

Congenital disorders of nervous system
Congenital disorders of musculoskeletal system